Harish Chandra Verma (born 03 April 1952), popularly known as hcv, is an Indian experimental physicist, author and emeritus professor of the Indian Institute of Technology Kanpur (IIT Kanpur). In 2021, he was awarded the Padma Shri, the fourth highest civilian award, by the Government of India for his contribution to Physics. His field of research is nuclear physics.

He has authored several schools, undergraduate and graduate level textbooks, including but not limited to the most popular and most reputed two-volume Concepts of Physics, extensively used by students appearing for various high-level competitive examinations. 

He has co-founded Shiksha Sopan, a social upliftment organization for economically weaker children living near the campus of IIT Kanpur. He has dedicated himself in training young minds in the field of Physics. He has immensely contributed to popularising Physics education among Indian students and teachers by conducting lectures and experimental demonstrations.

He has been awarded the Maulana Abul Kalam Azad Shiksha Puruskar by the Bihar state government.

Early life and study
Verma obtained his B.Sc. degree at the Patna Science College. He obtained his M.Sc. and Ph.D. at the Indian Institute of Technology (IIT), Kanpur.

Career

Patna Science College
In early 1980, Verma joined Patna Science College as a lecturer. He remained at the college as a lecturer and reader for 15 years before resigning from the college and joining IIT Kanpur.

IIT Kanpur
Verma joined IIT Kanpur in 1994 as an assistant professor. Here he pursued research in experimental nuclear physics. He has published 139 research papers. He retired on 30 June 2017.

Physics outreach
Verma has developed more than six hundred ‘low cost’ physics experiments that teachers can employ in their classrooms. In 2011, he set up the National Anveshika Network of India (NANI), a flagship program of the Indian Association of Physics Teachers (IAPT). He is the national coordinator for this program. There are currently 22 Anveshikas in the country.

Bibliography
 Concepts of Physics Part-1, Bharati Bhawan Publishers & Distributors, 1992, 
 Concepts of Physics Part-2, Bharati Bhawan Publishers & Distributors, 1992,  
 Quantum Physics, Surya Publication, 
 Foundation Science Physics for class 9, Bharati Bhawan Publishers & Distributors,  
 Foundation Science Physics for class 10, Bharati Bhawan Publishers & Distributors, 
 Bhautiki Ki Samajh Part-1, Bharati Bhawan Publishers & Distributors, 
 Classical Electromagnetism, Bharati Bhawan Publishers & Distributors,

Online courses 
Nuclear Physics: Fundamentals and Applications (organized by National Program for Technology Enhanced Learning, NPTEL)
Learning Physics through Simple Experiments (Massive Online Open Course in 2016)
Physics of Semiconductors (Massive Online Open Course in 2017)
B.Sc. courses in Hindi - Basics of Special Theory of Relativity (2018)
Basics of Quantum Mechanics (2019)
Advanced Course on the Special Theory of Relativity (2020)
Classical Electromagnetism - Electrostatics (2020)
Classical Mechanics (2021)
The Story of Photoelectric Effect (2021)

Awards 
 Padma Shri (2021)
 Maulana Abul Kalam Azad Shiksha Purashkar (2017)

References

Recipients of the Padma Shri
Recipients of the Padma Shri in science & engineering
Academic staff of IIT Kanpur
Physics educators
1952 births
Living people
People from Darbhanga